Benedek Oláh (born 29 March 1991) is a Finnish table tennis player. He competed at the 2016 Summer Olympics in the men's singles event, in which he was eliminated in the second round by Jonathan Groth. Benedek was born to Hungarian parents in Kalajoki, Finland, but grew up in Seinäjoki.

Career

2021 
Benedek entered WTT Doha 2021 with a world rank of 85. He upset world ranked 69 Chen Chien-An in the second round of the qualifying draw in the WTT Contender event. Benedek would lose to World Ranked 144 Andreas Levenko in the next round; however, Levenko would go on to have a highly successful tournament, including an upset of world ranked number 15 Liam Pitchford.

References

External links
 
 
 

1991 births
Living people
Finnish table tennis players
Male table tennis players
Olympic table tennis players of Finland
Table tennis players at the 2016 Summer Olympics
Finnish people of Hungarian descent
People from Kalajoki
People from Seinäjoki
Table tennis players at the 2015 European Games
Table tennis players at the 2019 European Games
European Games competitors for Finland
Sportspeople from South Ostrobothnia